Portland City Council may refer to:

 The Portland, Maine City Council
 The Portland, Oregon City Council, part of the Government of Portland, Oregon